John Duncan MacLean (December 8, 1873 – March 28, 1948) was a teacher, physician, politician and the 20th premier of British Columbia, Canada.

MacLean was a practicing doctor in the city of Greenwood when he was elected in the 1916 election to the provincial legislature as a Liberal. He served as minister of education and provincial secretary in the cabinets of Harlan Carey Brewster and John Oliver before becoming minister of finance in 1924.  In the election that year, he rain and won in the Yale riding.

Maclean became premier when Oliver died in 1927 at a time when the Liberal government was in decline. He was unable to reverse his party's fortunes, and was defeated in the 1928 election by the rival Conservatives. Later that year he attempted to enter the House of Commons of Canada in a by-election as a Liberal candidate, but was defeated by fewer than one hundred votes. He spent the rest of his life as chairman of the Canadian Farm Loan Board.

Election results (partial)

References

The Canadian Encyclopedia: John Duncan MacLean
Grand Lodge of British Columbia: John Duncan MacLean

1873 births
1948 deaths
Premiers of British Columbia
Leaders of the British Columbia Liberal Party
British Columbia Liberal Party MLAs
Canadian people of Scottish descent
People from Queens County, Prince Edward Island
Burials at Beechwood Cemetery (Ottawa)